The 1955 Brownlow Medal was the 28th year the award was presented to the player adjudged the fairest and best player during the Victorian Football League (VFL) home and away season. Fred Goldsmith of the South Melbourne Football Club won the medal by polling twenty-one votes during the 1955 VFL season.

Leading votegetters

References 

1955 in Australian rules football
1955